Fernando Manuel Pinto Rodrigues (born 13 October 1975 in Setúbal), commonly known as Nandinho, is a Portuguese retired footballer who played as a left back.

Honours
Vitória Setúbal
Taça de Portugal: 2004–05

References

External links

1975 births
Living people
Sportspeople from Setúbal
Portuguese footballers
Association football defenders
Primeira Liga players
Liga Portugal 2 players
Segunda Divisão players
F.C. Maia players
S.C. Salgueiros players
F.C. Alverca players
Vitória F.C. players
Cypriot First Division players
Alki Larnaca FC players
Portuguese expatriate footballers
Expatriate footballers in Cyprus
Portuguese expatriate sportspeople in Cyprus